Getting Married in Buffalo Jump is a 1990 Canadian TV movie filmed in Alberta, Canada. In specific Cowley, Lundbreck, and Pincher Creek. It was directed by Eric Till and stars Wendy Crewson and Paul Gross.

Plot
After her father's death Sophie Ware returns to her home town in hopes of running the family ranch. She struggles with the awkwardness of being home as she is now used to living in a big city as an accomplished musician. She is surprised when Alex, the farm's handyman, offers her a marriage of convenience in order to keep the farm afloat.

Cast
 Wendy Crewson  as Sophie Ware
 Paul Gross  as Alex Bresnyachuk
 Marion Gilsenan  as Vera Ware
 Victoria Snow  as Eleanor
 Murray Cruchley  as Robert Marcovich
 Kyra Harper  as Annie
 Diane Gordon  as Momma Bresnyachuk
 Ivan Horsky  as Poppa Bresnyachuk
 Florence Patterson  as Irene McCallum
 Alexander Brown  as Bennie
 Andy Maton  as Walter
 Kirk Grayson  as Dance teacher
 Kent McNeill  as Luke Bresnyachuk
 Lesley Schatz  as Country Singer
 J.C. Roberts  as Rancher in Bar

Awards
The film was nominated for four Gemini awards:
 Best Performance by an Actress in a Leading Role in a Dramatic Program or Mini-Series for Wendy Crewson
 Best Performance by an Actress in a Supporting Role for Marion Gilsenan
 Best TV Movie for Flora Macdonald and Peter Kelly
 Best Writing in a Dramatic Program or Mini-Series for John Frizzell

External links
 

CBC Television original films
English-language Canadian films
Films based on Canadian novels
1990 television films
1990 films
Films set in Alberta
Films shot in Alberta
Films directed by Eric Till
Canadian drama television films
1990s English-language films
1990s Canadian films